Lubāba bint al-Ḥārith (died ), also known as Umm Faḍl, was a prominent early Muslim. Two of her sisters, Maymunah bint al-Harith and Zaynab bint Khuzayma became wives of the Islamic Prophet Muhammad.

Family 
Lubaba was a member of the Banu Hilal clan, a branch of the Banu Amir tribe who were prominent in Mecca. (This tribe was distinct from the Quraysh.)

Her father was Al-Harith ibn Hazan ibn Zubayr ibn Al-Hazm ibn Rubiya ibn Abdullah ibn Hilal ibn Amer ibn Saasaa Al-Hilali, and her mother was Hind bint Awf ibn Zuhayr ibn Al-Harith. Lubaba had two brothers and a sister from this marriage, and her father also had three daughters by another wife, while her mother had one son by a former husband. Al-Harith died while Lubaba was still a child, and Hind then married Khuzayma ibn al-Harith al-Hilali. This marriage produced one daughter but was short-lived, and Hind next married Umays ibn Ma'ad al-Khathmi, by whom she had three further children.

Lubaba married Abbas ibn Abdul Muttalib al-Hashimi, who was an uncle of Prophet Muhammad. The union produced seven children: Al-Fadl, Abdullah, Ubaydullah, Qutham, Ma'bad, AbdurRahman and Umm Habib. Abbas also had five children by his other wives.

Islam 
 
Lubaba claimed to be the second woman to convert to Islam, the same day as her close friend Khadijah. She and her sisters were very prominent in the early Muslim community. Prophet Muhammad commented on their family effort: "The faithful sisters are Asma and Salma, daughters of Umays, and Lubaba and Maymuna, daughters of Al-Harith."

Abbas had kept his Islam secret in 622, so he and Lubaba remained in Mecca when other Muslims emigrated to Medina.

Death of Abu Lahab 
When the news of the Meccan defeat at the Battle of Badr arrived in Mecca in 624, there was general consternation; but Abbas's Muslim freedman, Abu Rafi, could not contain his joy. Abbas's brother Abu Lahab was so furious that he assaulted Abu Rafi, knocking him to the ground and then kneeling on top of him to continue beating him. Several able-bodied men witnessed or were in calling distance of this attack, but it was Lubaba who grabbed a tent-pole and cracked it across Abu Lahab's head, asking, “Do you think it’s all right to attack him because Abbas is absent?” Abu Lahab's head was split open, exposing his skull; When he died a week later, it was said to be of an infection, ulcer, or the plague.

Attention from Ka'b ibn al-Ashraf 
A few months later, Lubaba was the subject of a love-song by the Jewish poet Ka'b ibn al-Ashraf.

The song is almost certainly sarcastic, as the Amir tribe were Ka'b's traditional enemies and, in his perception, the reverse of "honourable" or "trustworthy". The reference to pedlar's products in the third and fourth lines, and to wobbling flesh in the fifth and sixth, presumably indicates that Lubaba was plump, painted and middle-aged (although she was probably under thirty).

Later life 
 
Abbas officially accepted Islam just before the conquest of Mecca in 630, twenty years after his wife.

Lubaba died during the caliphate of Uthman.

See also
 Companions of the Prophet
 List of Sahabah
 Banu Abbas
 Banu Hashim

References

External links
 Islam Online

Women companions of the Prophet
Banu Hilal
590s births
655 deaths
6th-century Arabs
7th-century Arabs